Penicillium caerulescens is a fungus species of the genus of Penicillium which was isolated from soil.

See also
List of Penicillium species

References 

caerulescens
Fungi described in 1983